The 1964–65 Sussex County Football League season was the 40th in the history of Sussex County Football League a football competition in England.

Division One

Division One featured 15 clubs which competed in the division last season, along with two new clubs, promoted from Division Two:
Seaford Town
Selsey

League table

Division Two

Division Two featured twelve clubs which competed in the division last season, along with six new clubs:
APV Athletic, relegated from Division One
Ferring
Sidley United, relegated from Division One
Steyning, joined from the Brighton, Hove & District League
Wadhurst
Wick, joined from the West Sussex League

Also, Three Bridges United changed name to Three Bridges.

League table

References

1964-65
S